John Robert Jones ( – ) wrote science fiction as John Dalmas. He wrote many books based on military and governmental themes throughout his career. His first published novel was The Yngling, serialized beginning in the October–November 1969 issue of Analog.

Bibliography

Collection of short stories
 Otherwhens, Otherwheres: Favorite Tales (2002)

Fanglith
 Fanglith, Baen Books, 1985, 1987
 Return to Fanglith, Baen Books, 1987

Lion of Farside
 The Lion of Farside, Baen Books, 1995: a simple American farmer marries a beautiful redhead with green eyes. When she is kidnapped by her family and taken back to the magical world she was born in, he buys a revolver and rifle and follows to rescue her. Complications occur. His guns do not work, magic abounds, and he is captured by slavers the moment he crosses into the new world.
 The Bavarian Gate, Baen Books, 1997
 The Lion Returns, Baen Books, 1999

Lizard War
 The Lizard War, Baen Books, 1989
 The Helverti Invasion, Baen Books, 2004

Non-series novels
 The Varkaus Conspiracy, Tor Books 1983, 1987
 Touch the Stars: Emergence (with Carl Martin), Tor Books 1983
 The Scroll of Man, Tor Books 1985
 The Reality Matrix, Baen Books, 1986
 The Walkaway Clause, Tor Books 1986
 The Playmasters (with Rod Martin), Baen Books, 1987
 The General's President, Baen Books, 1988
 The Lantern of God, Baen Books, 1989
 Soldiers, Baen Books, 2001
 The Puppet Master, Baen Books, 2001
 The Second Coming, Baen Books, April 2004

Regiment
 The Regiment, Baen Books, 1987, 1990, 1992, 1995
 The White Regiment, Baen Books, 1990, 1993
 The Kalif's War, Baen Books 1991
 The Regiment's War, Baen Books, 1993
 The Three-Cornered War, Baen Books, 1999
 The Regiment: A Trilogy (omnibus of The Regiment, The White Regiment and The Regiment's War), Baen Books, 2004

Yngling
 The Yngling, serialized in Analog, Oct and Nov 1969; later (expanded) by Pyramid Books 1971; Jove Books 1977; (revised) Tor Books 1984, 1987; Baen Books 1992 as part of The Orc Wars (see below)
 Homecoming, Tor Books 1984; Baen Books 1992 as part of The Orc Wars (see below)
 The Orc Wars, Baen Books, 1992; includes The Yngling, an expanded version of Exodus ... Genesis originally published in Analog, Oct 1970, and Homecoming
 The Yngling and the Circle of Power, Baen Books, 1992
 The Yngling in Yamato, Baen Books, 1994

Footnotes

References

External links
 
 Official forum at IBDoF
 Bio, bibliography and book covers at Fantastic Fiction

1926 births
2017 deaths
20th-century American male writers
20th-century American novelists
20th-century American short story writers
21st-century American male writers
21st-century American novelists
21st-century American short story writers
American male novelists
American male short story writers
American science fiction writers